Wilfried Kemmer (20 November 1943 – 21 August 2007) was a German football midfielder and later manager.

References

1943 births
2007 deaths
German footballers
VfL Wolfsburg players
VfB Lübeck players
Association football midfielders
2. Bundesliga players
German football managers
VfL Wolfsburg managers
West German footballers
West German football managers